Čiekurkalns is neighbourhood of Northern District in Riga, the capital of Latvia. It is located on the southwestern shore of Lake Ķīšezers.

In April 2014, the new building of the State Revenue Service of Latvia was unveiled at Talejas iela 1 in Čiekurkalns. 

The building of the railway station of the same name, which serves the Riga–Lugaži Railway along the southern limits of the neighbourhood, stands in the Teika neighbourhood.

References

External links

 

Neighbourhoods in Riga